The 17011 / 12 Intercity Express is an Express train belonging to Indian Railways South Central Railway zone that runs between  and   in India.

History
Later Extended to  & Then Extended Till .

Coaches
The 17011 / 12 Intercity Express has 16 ICF-CBC Rakes with 1 Ac Chair car , 3 Second sitting Reservation Coaches , 10 General Coaches & 2 SLR Coaches

Service
With halting in 19 Stations.

Routing

Traction
As the route is electrified, a  based WAP-7 electric locomotive pulls the train to its destination.

Gallery

References

External links
17011 Intercity Express at India Rail Info
17012 Intercity Express at India Rail Info

Intercity Express (Indian Railways) trains
Transport in Hyderabad, India
Rail transport in Telangana